The Denver Guardian was a fake news website, known for a popular untrue story about Hillary Clinton posted on the site on November 5, 2016, three days before the 2016 U.S. presidential election, which Clinton lost. The story, entitled "FBI Agent Suspected In Hillary Email Leaks Found Dead In Apparent Murder-Suicide", alleged that an FBI agent investigating Clinton had been found dead in a Maryland house fire. 
The story was shared on Facebook (a news source for "44 percent of U.S. adults") more than half a million times and earned more than 15.5 million impressions. According to a Denver Post newspaper story on the Denver Guardian and the Clinton article,
While "The Guardian" claimed to be Denver's "oldest" news source, the site's domain was first registered only a few months before in July 2016;
The story on Clinton appeared to be the only article on the website (it was "the only story showing up under the "News" section and all other sections are turning up errors"); 
While the story quoted a "Walkerville Police Chief Pat Frederick", Walkersville, Maryland, does not have a police department; but has Five Resident State Police officers  And the address the site listed for "The Guardian" newsroom was actually a parking lot.

The site was registered anonymously and built using WordPress, but an investigator employed by National Public Radio found the site was operated by Jestin Coler, the founder, and CEO of Disinfomedia and owner of several other faux news sites.  As of March 27, 2017, the site still existed but had no news or any other content. As of January 28, 2018, the site does not exist anymore. When typing the address into a browser, it redirects to "jestincoler.com", a website owned by Coler himself, containing information about himself, his work, his 'achievements', and how to contact him. He openly admits to doing morally questionable, but legal things, such as writing and publishing fake news articles for payment. Jestin Coler, as of April 2022, is running for the Indiana House of Representatives.

See also
Baltimore Gazette – a defunct newspaper, the name of which has been reused by a fake news website.

References

Fake news websites
Internet properties established in 2016